The Coils Creek Limestone is a geologic formation in Nevada. It preserves fossils dating back to the Devonian period.

See also

 List of fossiliferous stratigraphic units in Nevada
 Paleontology in Nevada

References

Devonian geology of Nevada